Akkaya is a village in the Dodurga District of Çorum Province in Turkey. Its population is 258 (2022). The village is populated by Kurds.

References

Villages in Dodurga District
Kurdish settlements in Çorum Province